The rivière à Ange (English: Angel River) is a tributary of the West shore of the ruisseau du Pied du Mont (English: stream of the Mount Foot), flowing entirely in the town of Baie-Saint-Paul, in the Charlevoix Regional County Municipality, in the administrative region of Capitale-Nationale, in the province of Quebec, in Canada.

This valley is mainly served by a secondary forest road which connects to the Seminary road which cuts the intermediate part of the Pied du Mont stream. Forestry is the main economic activity in this valley; recreational tourism, second.

The surface of the Ange river is generally frozen from the beginning of December until the beginning of April; however, safe circulation on the ice is generally done from mid-December to the end of March. The water level of the river varies with the seasons and the precipitation; the spring flood generally occurs in April.

Geography 
The river at Ange takes its source at the mouth of Grand lac à Ange. The mouth of this lake is located at:
  north-east of the course of the Sainte-Anne River;
  south-west of the confluence of the river at Ange and the ruisseau du Pied du Mont;
  south-west of the mouth of the rivière des Mares (confluence with the Rivière du Gouffre);
  south-west of Baie-Saint-Paul town center.

 ), collecting the outlet (coming from the northwest) from Lac Paradis, to the North Arm of the Rivière à Ange (constituting the outlet of Petit lac à Ange);
  towards the east in a deep valley by forming a curve towards the north to go around a mountain, until its mouth.

The river at Ange flows in a bend on the west bank of the ruisseau du Pied du Mont in Baie-Saint-Paul. This mouth is located at:
  south of the seminar road;
  south-west of the village center of Saint-Placide-Nord
  west of downtown Baie-Saint-Paul;
  west of the confluence of the Gouffre river and the St. Lawrence River.

Toponymy 
This toponym appears on a 1955 map. According to oral testimony collected in 1970, this toponym refers to the first name of the guardian of the Lac Équerre facilities.

The toponym “Rivière à Ange” was formalized on March 25, 1997, at the Place Names Bank of the Commission de toponymie du Québec.

Notes and references

Appendices

Related articles 
 Charlevoix Regional County Municipality
 Baie-Saint-Paul, a city
 Ruisseau du Pied du Mont
 Rivière des Mares (Gouffre River tributary)
 Rivière du Gouffre
 St. Lawrence River
 List of rivers of Quebec

External links 

Rivers of Capitale-Nationale
Charlevoix Regional County Municipality